The 2009–10 Swiss Challenge League was the seventh season of the Swiss Challenge League, the second tier of the Swiss football league pyramid. It began on 24 July 2009 and ended on 15 May 2010. The champions of this season, FC Thun, earned promotion to the 2010–11 Super League. The bottom two teams, FC Le Mont and FC Gossau, were relegated to the 1. Liga.

Teams

League table

Top goal scorers
23 goals
 Nick Proschwitz (Vaduz)
20 goals
 Dante Adrian Senger (Locarno)
17 goals
 Innocent Emeghara (Winterthur)
16 goals
 Ezequiel Scarione (Thun)
14 goals
 Carlos Da Silva (Lugano)

External links
 Swiss Challenge League

Swiss Challenge League seasons
2009–10 in Swiss football
Swiss